is a Japanese manga series written and illustrated by Tooru Fujisawa. It was serialized in Shueisha‘s Weekly Young Jump magazine from 2006 to 2007. A sequel manga, titled Kamen Teacher Black was published in the same magazine from 2013 to 2014. It was adapted into a live action television series in 2013 and was adapted into a live action film in 2014. The special for this film was broadcast by NTV on February 14, 2014, on Kinyou Roadshow.

Characters
 Taisuke Fujigaya as Araki Gota
 Aya Omasa as Ichimura Miki
 Takumi Saito as Iikura Rui
 Fuma Kikuchi as Takehara Kinzo
 Jesse Lewis as Kusanagi Keigo
 Yuta Kishi as Shishimaru
 Taiga Kyomoto as Bon
 Yanagi Shuntaro as Ryōta
 Taketomi Seika as Kondo Kanako
 Maeda Goki as Kotaro
 Tsukada Ryoichi as Kinpatsu Sensei
 Shiga Kotaro as Sugawara Kentaro
 Shintaro Yamada as Tooyama Shunsaku
 Fujisawa Ayano as Honda Ayumi
 Musaka Naomasa as Kobayashi Tōbē
 Yamamoto Maika as Kobayashi Saeko

Media

Manga
Kamen Teacher, written and illustrated by Tooru Fujisawa, was serialized in Shueisha's seinen manga magazine Weekly Young Jump from August 24, 2006, to October 25, 2007. Shueisha collected its chapters in four tankōbon volumes, released from April 19 to December 19, 2007.

A sequel, titled , was serialized in Weekly Young Jump from April 25, 2013, to October 16, 2014. Shueisha collected its chapters in five tankōbon volumes, released from August 19, 2013, to December 19, 2014.

Volume list

Kamen Teacher

Kamen Teacher Black

References

External links
Official TV series website 
Official film website 

2013 Japanese television series debuts
2013 Japanese television series endings
Shueisha franchises
Shueisha manga
Live-action films based on manga
Manga adapted into films
Nippon TV dramas
Tooru Fujisawa
Teaching anime and manga
2010s Japanese films